was a   after Kankō and before Kannin. This period spanned the years from December 1012 through April 1017.

Change of era
 1012 :  The era name was changed to mark Emperor Sanjō's accession in the previous year. The previous era ended and a new one commenced in Kankō 9, on the 25th day of the 12th month of 1012.

Events of the Chōwa era
 1012 (Chōwa 1, 8th month): Emperor Sanjō marries a daughter of kampaku Fujiwara no Michinaga.
 1016 (Chōwa 4, 11th month): A great fire broke out in the Imperial palace; and it was reduced to cinders.
 March 10, 1016 (Chōwa 5, 29th day of the 1st month): In the 5th year of Emperor Sanjō's reign (三条天皇5年), he abdicated; and the succession (‘‘senso’’) was received by a cousin. Shortly thereafter, Emperor Go-Ichijō is said to have acceded to the throne (‘‘sokui’’).

Notes

References
 Brown, Delmer M. and Ichirō Ishida, eds. (1979).  Gukanshō: The Future and the Past. Berkeley: University of California Press. ;  OCLC 251325323
 Nussbaum, Louis-Frédéric and Käthe Roth. (2005).  Japan encyclopedia. Cambridge: Harvard University Press. ;  OCLC 58053128
 Titsingh, Isaac. (1834). Nihon Odai Ichiran; ou,  Annales des empereurs du Japon.  Paris: Royal Asiatic Society, Oriental Translation Fund of Great Britain and Ireland. OCLC 5850691
 Varley, H. Paul. (1980). A Chronicle of Gods and Sovereigns: Jinnō Shōtōki of Kitabatake Chikafusa. New York: Columbia University Press. ;  OCLC 6042764

External links
 National Diet Library, "The Japanese Calendar" -- historical overview plus illustrative images from library's collection

Japanese eras